"Step" is a pop song by the Japanese duo and idol unit ClariS, written by Kz. It was released as the unit's tenth single on April 16, 2014 by SME Records. The song was used as the second opening theme to the 2014 anime series Nisekoi. A music video was produced for "Step", directed by Jungo. The single peaked at No. 3 on Japan's weekly Oricon singles chart.

Composition
"Step" is a synthpop song with instrumentation from a synthesizer. It is set in common time and moves at a tempo of 146 beats per minute in the E minor key throughout the song. The introduction starts with the synthesized music to transition into the first verse, followed by the chorus. After a short bridge, this pattern is repeated for the second verse and chorus featuring the same music with different lyrics. A break is used to transition into the third verse, immediately followed by the chorus used as the outro to close the song.

Release and reception
"Step" was released in a regular edition and two limited editions on April 16, 2014 as a CD by SME Records in Japan. One of the limited edition versions was packaged with Nisekoi artwork and also contained a short version of "Step" instead of its instrumental version. The other limited edition version came bundled with a DVD containing the music video for "Step". The song peaked at No. 3 on Japan's weekly Oricon singles chart and charted for 8 weeks. "Step" debuted and peaked on the Billboard Japan Hot 100 at No. 5.

Track listing

Personnel
ClariS
Clara – vocals
Alice – vocals

Additional musicians
Hiroomi Shitara – guitar
Tak Miyazawa – guitar

Production
Takashi Koiwa – mixer
Yuji Chinone – mastering
Tatsuo Murai – art direction, design

Charts

References

2014 singles
2014 songs
ClariS songs
SME Records singles
Anime songs